The Group is a 1966 American ensemble film directed by Sidney Lumet based on the 1963 novel of the same name by Mary McCarthy about the lives of a group of eight female graduates from Vassar from 1933 to 1940.

The cast of this social satire includes Candice Bergen, Joan Hackett, Elizabeth Hartman, Shirley Knight, Jessica Walter, Kathleen Widdoes, and Joanna Pettet. The film also features small roles for Hal Holbrook, Carrie Nye, James Broderick, Larry Hagman and Richard Mulligan. The film touched on controversial topics for its time: free love, contraception, abortion, lesbianism, and mental illness.

Plot
After their days at a prestigious Eastern university, eight devoted women friends go their separate ways. Wealthy and very beautiful Lakey, always regarded as their leader, leaves for Europe to begin a new life on her own.

The domestic lives of the others go mainly awry. Priss marries an overbearing, controlling doctor and has two miscarriages before she gives birth to a son. Kay, who was Lakey's pet and was always less sophisticated and wealthy than the other members of the group, marries an abusive playwright who cheats on her. After an unhappy affair with a cold, sarcastic painter, Dottie gives up a flamboyant lifestyle in Greenwich Village to marry a dull Arizona businessman. Pokey has her hands full with two sets of twins. Helena travels the world, but is unable to find happiness at home, while catty and ambitious Libby becomes successful in the literary world despite lacking depth. Polly has an affair with a married man, but later finds real happiness with a kind doctor.

With the outbreak of war in Europe in 1939, Lakey then returns home. When the others discover that the woman with her is more than just a traveling companion, they realize that she is a lesbian. After a tragedy that results in the death of Kay in 1940, Lakey joins them at the funeral for one last time together as the group.

Cast

Main
 Candice Bergen as Elinor "Lakey" Eastlake
 Joan Hackett as Dottie Renfrew Latham
 Elizabeth Hartman as Priss Hartshorn Crockett
 Shirley Knight as Polly Andrews Ridgeley
 Joanna Pettet as Kay Strong Peterson
 Mary-Robin Redd as Mary "Pokey" Prothero Beauchamp
 Jessica Walter as Libby MacAusland
 Kathleen Widdoes as Helena Davison
 James Broderick as Dr. James "Jim" Ridgeley
 James Congdon as Sloan Crockett
 Larry Hagman as Harald Peterson
 Hal Holbrook as Gus Leroy
 Richard Mulligan as Dick Brown
 Robert Emhardt as Henry Andrews
 Carrie Nye as Norine Blake

Supporting
 Philippa Bevans as Mrs. Hartshorn
 Leta Bonynge as Mrs. Prothero
 Marion Brash as Radio Man's Wife
 Sarah Burton as Mrs. Davison
 Flora Campbell as Mrs. MacAusland
 Bruno Di Cosmi as Nils
 Leora Dana as Mrs. Renfrew
 Bill Fletcher as Bill, the Actor
 George Gaynes as Brook Latham
 Martha Greenhouse as Mrs. Bergler
 Russell Hardie as Mr. Davison
 Vince Harding as Mr. Eastlake
 Doreen Lang as Nurse Swenson
 Chet London as Radio Man
 Baruch Lumet as Mr. Schneider
 John O'Leary as Put Blake
 Hildy Parks as Nurse Catherine
 Lidia Prochnicka as The Baroness
 Polly Rowles as Mrs. Andrews
 Douglas Rutherford as Mr. Prothero
 Truman Smith as Mr. Bergler
 Loretta White as Mrs. Eastlake

Cameo appearance/Uncredited
 Arthur Anderson as Pokey's husband John Beauchamp
 Ron Charles as Dr. Jones
 Richard Graham as Rev. Garland
 Edward Holmes as Mr. MacAusland
 Brian Sands as Steven Crockett (aged 4)

Music
Songs used:
 Landlord, Fill the Flowing Bowl,  traditional.
 The Cannibal King, traditional.
 Liebeslieder-Walzer (Wie des Abends schöne Röte, Vögelein durchrauscht die Luft), Johannes Brahms
 Come, Ye Sons of Art!, Henry Purcell

Release
The film grossed $6 million at the box office, earning $3 million in US theatrical rentals. It was the 25th highest-grossing film of 1966.

Home media
The Group was released to DVD by MGM Home Video on January 15, 2011, via the MGM Choice Collection as a Region 1 manufacture-on-demand DVD.

Reception
Critic Moira Finnie of FilmStruck sums up The Group: The crowd of highly educated, privileged characters on the screen in The Group approached their postgraduate life in the Great Depression as though it was a midterm exam to be aced and filed away, with each milestone treated like a fast course in typing or dancing, another skill acquired, to be trotted out at the next luncheon with the other girls in the group. Full of ideas about a woman's role in the society, but with little real life experience other than in school, the movie chronicles their continued education in the real world.

Variety wrote that the film is faithful to the novel but retains too much detail.

Awards
 Joan Hackett was nominated for the British BAFTA Film Award for the best foreign (i.e. non-British) actress.
 The film was nominated for the Golden Bear at the 16th Berlin International Film Festival in 1966.

See also
 List of American films of 1966

References

External links
 
 
 
 
 

1966 films
1966 drama films
American drama films
Films about abortion
Films based on American novels
Films directed by Sidney Lumet
Films set in the 1930s
Films set in the 1940s
Films set in Arizona
Films set in Massachusetts
Films set in New York City
Films set in Ohio
Films set in 1933
Films set in 1934
Films set in 1935
Films set in 1936
Films set in 1937
Films set in 1938
Films set in 1939
Films set in 1940
Films with screenplays by Sidney Buchman
United Artists films
American feminist films
Lesbian-related films
1966 LGBT-related films
1960s feminist films
1960s female buddy films
1960s English-language films
1960s American films